Benjamin Jepson (1832 – 1914) was one of the first primary school music teachers in the United States, and introduced music to the public schools of New Haven, Connecticut, in 1865. The Benjamin Jepson Interdistrict Magnet School and the Jepson School are named after him.

References

New Haven Independent
Jepson School

Notes

American music educators
1832 births
1914 deaths